Rogan is an Irish surname, deriving from the Irish Ó Ruadhagáin, which can be loosely translated to mean "red-haired."

History
The clan is descended from one of the septs of Oriel which originated in Counties Armagh and Monaghan and parts of South Down, Louth and Fermanagh. Recordings from Irish Church Registers include: the christening of Mary, daughter of Henry and Margaret Rogan, at Downpatrick, County Down on January 23, 1799, and the christening of Ann Jane, daughter of Dan and Anne Rogan, at Aghalee, County Antrim, on December 25, 1813. Anne Rogan, aged 17 yrs., was a famine emigrant to America, leaving Liverpool for New York in March 1846. The first recorded spelling of the family name is shown to be that of Elizabeth Rogan, which was dated 1743, christened at Inch by Gorey, County Wexford. From the "Annals of the Four masters: 1179, Ó Ruaghagain (O'Rogan), Lord of Iveagh (south Co. Down), died of three nights sickness, shortly after he had been expelled for violating the Canoin-Phatruig (Canon Phadraig, or "Patrick's Testament", also known as the Book of Armagh)

The surname may refer to: 
 Alex Rogan, a fictional character in the 1987 movie The Last Starfighter
 Adrian Rogan, one of six people killed in the 1994 Loughinisland massacre
 Anton Rogan, Irish soccer player 
 Barney Rogan, American film editor
 Bullet Rogan (1893-1967), American baseball player 
 Dennis Rogan, Baron Rogan, Irish politician
 Emma Rogan, Sinn Féin politician in Northern Ireland
 Ian Rogan, a name by which British comic writer and editor Steve MacManus is sometimes credited
 James E. Rogan, American politician from California 
 Joe Rogan, American comedian, podcaster, and UFC commentator 
 John Rogan (disambiguation), multiple people
 John "Jack" Rogan, founder of Rogan's Shoes
 Johnny Rogan, English author
 Markus Rogan, Austrian swimmer
 Seth Rogan, a misspelling of Seth Rogen, Canadian writer and comedian
 Thomas Rogan, a fictional character in The House of the Dead (arcade game)
 Tom Rogan, an American journalist
 Marc Rogan chef in Scotland

Martin Rogan, Professional Boxer, actor
County Antrim, Ireland

People with Rogan as a given name:
 Rogan Whitenails, British poet

 Places
 Rogans Hill, New South Wales, a suburb of Sydney, Australia 
 Rogan's Seat, a hill in the North Yorkshire dales of England 
 Rogan, Ukraine, a town in Kharkiv Oblast, Ukraine

See also
 Rogan Gosh (comics) 
 Rogan josh, a type of curry
 Stein Rogan + Partners advertising agency
 Rogan printing, an Indian textile printing craft 
 Rogan's Shoes, a Wisconsin-based shoe retailer
 Rogen § People with the name
 Rogin, surname

English-language surnames
Surnames of Irish origin
Irish families